Petros "Peter" Skapetis (born 13 January 1995) is an Australian professional footballer who last played as striker for National Premier Leagues Victoria side Altona Magic SC.

Playing career

Club
In April 2014, Skapetis joined Premier League side Stoke City, initially to play for their under-21 side.

Skapetis had trials at several clubs including Derby County, Cardiff City and Sheffield United late in 2016. He signed with Dover Athletic in March 2017.

Skapetis returned to Australia in 2017, where he underwent a trial with Brisbane Roar. He made his competitive debut for the Roar in their 2017 FFA Cup match against Melbourne Victory. Despite the Roar losing the game 5–1, Skapetis came on as a substitute and scored with a long-range effort late in the game.

On 18 January 2018, Skapetis left Brisbane Roar and joined fellow A-League club Central Coast Mariners on a one-year deal.

On 24 September 2018, National Premier Leagues Victoria side Dandenong Thunder SC announced the signing of Skapetis until the end of the 2020 NPL Victoria season.

International
Skapetis is eligible to play for Australia or Greece, and was contacted by both federations in 2013.

Honours

Club
Dover Athletic
 Kent Senior Cup: 2016–17

References

External links

1995 births
Living people
Association football forwards
Australian soccer players
Australian people of Greek descent
Dover Athletic F.C. players
Brisbane Roar FC players
Central Coast Mariners FC players
Dandenong Thunder SC players
South Melbourne FC players
Altona Magic SC players
Australia under-20 international soccer players
Australian expatriate soccer coaches
Expatriate footballers in England
Australian expatriate sportspeople in England
Soccer players from Melbourne